Mohra Shahwali railway station is located in Pakistan.

See also
 List of railway stations in Pakistan
 Pakistan Railways

References

External links

Railway stations in Rawalpindi District
Railway stations on Taxila–Khunjerab Railway Line